Ishwari Rajya Lakshmi Devi Shah (September 1907 – 27 June 1983) was the Queen consort and the second wife of Tribhuvan Bir Bikram Shah, King of the Kingdom of Nepal. She was the mother of Prince Basundhara Bir Bikram Shah and Princess Nalini Rajya Lakshmi Devi.

Life 
She was the daughter of Arjan Singh Sahib, Raja of Chhatara, Barhgaon and Oudh and his wife, Krishnavati Devi Sahiba.

She was married (at a young age in an arranged custom) at the Narayanhity Royal Palace, Kathmandu, in March 1919, to King Tribhuvan of Nepal as his second wife, in a double ceremony with her older sister Kanti, as his first wife.

She and her husband had as children:
 Prince Basundhara of Nepal (25 November 1921 – 31 August 1977), who married Princess Helen Shah of Nepal and had three daughters;
 Princess Nalini of Nepal (24 September 1924 – 11 June 2020).

Honours 
 Member of the Order of the Benevolent Ruler (1954).
 King Mahendra Coronation Medal (2 May 1956).
 King Birendra Coronation Medal (24 February 1975).

References

1907 births
1983 deaths
Nepalese queens consort
20th-century Nepalese nobility
Nepalese Hindus